Dynasty is an American prime time television soap opera that aired on ABC from January 12, 1981, to May 11, 1989. The series, created by Richard and Esther Shapiro and produced by Aaron Spelling, revolves around the Carringtons, a wealthy family residing in Denver, Colorado. Dynasty stars John Forsythe as oil magnate Blake Carrington, Linda Evans as his new wife Krystle, and later Joan Collins as his former wife Alexis.

Dynasty was conceived as ABC's competitor to CBS's prime time series Dallas. Ratings for the show's first season were unimpressive, but a revamp for the second season that included the arrival of Collins as scheming Alexis saw ratings enter the top 20. By the fall of 1982, it was a top 10 show, and by the spring of 1985, it was the #1 show in the United States. The series declined considerably in popularity during its final two seasons, and it was ultimately cancelled in the spring of 1989 after nine seasons and 220 episodes. A two-part miniseries, Dynasty: The Reunion, aired in October 1991.

Season one of Dynasty was delayed by the 1980 Screen Actors Guild strike, season two by the 1981 Writers Guild of America strike, and season nine by the 1988 Writers Guild of America strike.

NOTE: The Production Codes were taken from the United States Copyright Office.

Series overview

Episodes

Season 1 (1981)

Season 2 (1981–82)

Season 3 (1982–83)

Season 4 (1983–84)

Season 5 (1984–85)

Season 6 (1985–86)

The Colbys was spun off Dynasty during season six.

Season 7 (1986–87)

Season two of The Colbys aired concurrently with Dynasty season seven.

Season 8 (1987–88)

Season 9 (1988–89)

The Reunion

See also
 Carrington family tree

References

External links
 Dynasty episodes at UltimateDynasty.net
 

Dynasty (1981 TV series)
Lists of American drama television series episodes
Lists of soap opera episodes